is a 2012 Japanese 3D film directed by Tōru Kamei.

Cast
Jirō Satō
Asami Usuda
Naozumi Takahashi

References

External links
 

Japanese 3D films
2012 3D films
2012 films
2010s Japanese films